Holbeach railway station was a station in Holbeach, Lincolnshire. It opened on 15 November 1858 and closed on 2 March 1959.
The station buildings survived including station, up and down platform and the large goods shed (used as a garage).

The area is being developed for housing and the station is to be restored and converted into flats.

References

External links
 Holbeach Station, Reference Name MLI20231 on Lincs to the Past
 Holbeach station on 1946 O. S. map

Disused railway stations in Lincolnshire
Former Midland and Great Northern Joint Railway stations
Railway stations in Great Britain opened in 1858
Railway stations in Great Britain closed in 1959
Holbeach